The A20 autoroute or L'Occitane is a highway through central France.

Regions Crossed
The road travels through the areas of Occitania, Limousin and Midi-Pyrénées. It starts at Vierzon in Cher and finishes in the south at Montauban in Tarn-et-Garonne. However further sections between Orléans and Vierzon (A71) and Montauban-Toulouse (A62) could be renamed the A20 in the not too distant future. L'Occitane is free from Vierzon to Brive-la-Gaillarde via Limoges.

The operating companies are ASF between Cressensac and Montauban, DDE in the department between Vierzon and Nespouls.  The road crosses the following departments Cher, Indre, Creuse, Haute-Vienne, Corrèze, Lot, Tarn-et-Garonne

History
The motorway was proposed to reduce the travel time along the RN20 and to avoid congestion during holiday periods at Châteauroux, Argenton-sur-Creuse, Saint-Benoît-du-Sault, Limoges, Uzerche, Brive, Souillac, Cahors and Montauban.

Route

From Vierzon to Martel
The motorway is managed by the respective DDE in Cher, Indre, Creuse, Haute-Vienne, of Corrèze and Lot. It is a free motorway with 2x2 lanes, with certain sections with 2x3 lanes, for example the by-pass of Limoges.

History
 Pre 1992: The Brive and Limoges by-pass.
 1992 to 2000: creation of the various sections of the motorway

Future
In the long term, a new by-pass for Limoges is proposed (The A20bis project), in order to return the section of the A20 motorway which crosses the Limoges conurbation to its original planned use as a major urban road.

Junctions  

 A71 to A20 
 Péage
05 (Vierzon-North) to 1 km: served city Vierzon 
06 (Vierzon) to 3 km: served city Vierzon 
07 (Vierzon-South) to 6 km: served city Vierzon 
08 (Massay-Nord) to 9 km: served city Massay (half-exchanger) 
08 (Massay-South) to 15 km: served city Massay (half-exchanger) 
09 (Gracay) to 23 km: served city Gracay 
  Service Area: Champs-d'Amour
10 (Vatan-Nord) to 28 km: served city Vatan (half-exchanger) 
10 (Vatan-Sod) to 32 km: served city Vatan (half-exchanger) 
11 (Brion) to 42 km: served cities Brion, Levroux and Issoudun 
 Rest Area: Les Avionneurs (Southbound), Les Avionneurs (Northbound) Les Blés d'Or (Southbound)
12 (Déols) to 54 km: served cities Déols and Châteauroux 
13 (Châteauroux) to 60 km: served cities Châteauroux and Buzançais 
13.1 (Mézières-en-Brenne) to 64 km: served cities Châteauroux and Mézières-en-Brenne (half-exchanger) 
14 (Châteauroux-Sud) to 67 km: city served Châteauroux 
  Service Area: Mille Étangs  (Southbound), Val de l'Indre  (Northbound)
15 (Velles) to 75 km: served city Velles 
16 (Tendu) to 80 km: served city Tendu 
17 (Saint-Marcel-Nord) to 84 km: served cities Saint-Marcel and Argenton-sur-Creuse (half-exchanger) 
17 (Saint-Marcel-Sud) to 87 km: served cities Saint-Marcel and Argenton-sur-Creuse (half-exchanger) 
18 (Argenton sud) to 91 km: served city Argenton-sur-Creuse and Saint-Benoît-du-Sault
 Rest Area: La Marche Occitane  (Southbound), Val de Hollow (Northbound)
19 (Celon) to 98 km: served city Celon and Saint-Benoît-du-Sault
20 (Éguzon Saint-Benoit) to 107 km: served cities Éguzon-Chantôme and Saint-Benoît-du-Sault 
21 (Mouhet) to 118 km: city served Mouhet 
  Service Area: Mandé Bois 
22 (Saint-Sulpice-les-Feuilles La Souterraine) to 128 km: served cities Saint-Sulpice-les-Feuilles and La Souterraine 
23 (Magnac-Laval) to 136 km: served cities Magnac-Laval, La Souterraine and Bellac 
23.A corresponds to the direction of La Souterraine in Provence of Limoges. 
 Rest Area: Couleroute 
23.1 (Châteauponsac) to 143 km: served city Châteauponsac (half-exchanger) 
24 (Béssines) to 148 km: served city Bessines-sur-Gartempe 
25 (Razès) to 158 km: served city Razès 
26 (Ambazac) to 164 km: served city Ambazac 
27 (Bonnac-la-Côte) to 170 km: served city Bonnac-la-Côte 
 Rest Area: Beaune-Les-Mines  
28 to 175 km: served city Limoges 
29 (Beaubreuil) to 176 km: served city Limoges 
30 (Limoges-Nord) to 177 km: served city Limoges 
31 (Technopôle) to 179 km: served city Limoges 
32 to 181 km: served city Limoges 
33 (Limoges-Center) to 182 km: served city Limoges 
34 to 183 km: served city Limoges 
35 (Feytiat) to 185 km: served city Limoges 
36 (Limoges-Sud) to 188 km: served city Limoges 
37 (Boisseuil) to 190 km: served city Boisseuil 
38 (Vigen) to 195 km: served city Vigen 
39 (Saint-Hilaire-Bonneval) to 201 km: served city Saint-Hilaire-Bonneval 
40 (Pierre-Buffière) to 205 km: served city Pierre-Buffière 
Rest Area: Briance-Ligoure 
41 (Magnac-Bourg) to 214 km: served city Magnac-Bourg 
42 (Saint-Germain-les-Belles) to 220 km: served city Saint-Germain-les-Belles 
  Service Area: Porte de Corrèze
43 (Masseret) to 227 km: served city Masseret 
44 (Lubersac) to 233 km: served cities Lubersac and Uzerche 
45 (Uzerche Vigeois) to 246 km: served cities Uzerche, Vigeois and 25 km Tulle 
 Rest Area: Puy de Grâce 
46 (Perpezac-le-Noir) to 253 km: served cities Perpezac-le-Noir and Tulle 
 A89 to A20 
47 (Donzenac-Nord) to 261 km: served city Donzenac 
48 (Donzenac-Ouest) to 265 km: served city Donzenac 
49 (Ussac) to 269 km: served city Ussac 
 A89 to A20 
50 (Brive-Nord) to 273 km: served city Brive-la-Gaillarde 
51 (Brive-Sud) to 275 km: served city Brive-la-Gaillarde 
52 (Noailles) to 281 km: served city Noailles 
53 (Cressensac) to 285 km: served city Cressensac 
 Rest Areas: Pech Montat 
54 (Martel) to 293 km: served city Martel
 Péage

From Martel to Montauban
The motorway is operated by ASF. It is a toll road (closed system) with 2x2 lanes.

History
 1996 to 2003: Construction of the  section.

Junctions

55 (Souillac) to 303 km: served city Souillac 
56 (Labastide-Murat) to 325 km: served city Labastide-Murat 
  Service Area: Causses de la Lot 
 Rest Area: Rauze 
57 (Cahors-Nord) to 348 km: served city Cahors 
 Rest Area: Cahors 
58 (Cahors-Sud) to 371 km: served city Cahors 
 Rest Areas: Bois de Dourre 
59 (Caussade) to 393 km: served city Caussade 
 Péage
60 (Montauban-Nord) to 409 km: served city Montauban

Deviation of Montauban and Montauban section - A62
This section is managed by the DDE of Tarn-et-Garonne. It is in 2x2 lanes and free. The Montauban by-pass is the last missing link of A20. The link is currently signaled the RN20 which has yet to be upgraded to autoroute standard. To the south of Montauban, the RN20 was upgraded to motorway standard in the Nineties, and has been re-numbered the A62.

History
 1992: Construction of the Montauban by-pass
 2007: Upgrade to the motorway standard

Junctions

61 to 410 km: served city Montauban 
62 to 413 km: served city Montauban 
63 to 414 km: served city Montauban 
64 to 416 km: served city Montauban 
65 (Montauban-Sud) to 417 km: served city Montauban 
66 (Bressols) to 418: served city Bressols 
 Rest Area: Nauze-Vert 
67 to 423 km: served city Moulis 
68 to 424 km: served cities Toulouse and Agen 
 A62 to A20 
 A20 changes into RN20 and becomes a single carriageway road.

External links

 A20 Motorway on Saratlas

A20